A Day to Remember is a 1991 French film directed by Jean-Louis Bertuccelli starring Giulietta Masina.

Plot
Bertille is an old woman living in the French countryside who is preparing to sell her home and move in with her daughter. Before she sells the property, she invites her children for a last visit at their childhood home. This visit brings about typical family reminiscences and conflicts, including the homecoming of her youngest son who has been in prison.

Cast
Giulietta Masina as Bertille
Véronique Silver as Christiane
Éva Darlan as Marie
Jean Benguigui as Marcel
Muni as Thérèse
Michel Berto as Bruno
Jacques Toja as Jean-François
Maxime Leroux as Raphaël
Georges Staquet as Alain
Isabelle Mergault as Elisa
François Dyrek as Jean
Pierre Gérald as Lucien

External links

1991 films
1991 drama films
1990s French-language films
Films directed by Jean-Louis Bertuccelli
French drama films
1990s French films